Negarestan (also Romanized as Negārestān) is a village in Ramjerd-e Do Rural District, Dorudzan District, Marvdasht County, Fars Province, Iran. At the 2006 census, its population was 308, in 73 families.

References 

Populated places in Marvdasht County